The British Sikh Report, (Punjabi: ਬ੍ਰਿਟਿਸ਼ ਸਿੱਖ ਰਿਪੋਰਟ) also known as the BSR, is an annual report launched in Parliament every year about Sikhs in the United Kingdom. The report looks at the views of Sikhs living in the UK and provides this information e.g. the government, non-governmental organisations, companies and other groups. It is one of the largest projects to regularly study the needs and wants of Sikhs anywhere in the world.

History 

The BSR was founded by Jasvir Singh in 2012 and is created annually by a team of research analysts, lawyers, academics, social workers, senior consultants and managers who work on the BSR on a voluntary basis. The Editor of the report is Jagdev Singh Virdee MBE, who is a British statistician. The report takes approximately 500 hours and costs £30,000 to create every year. The purpose of BSR is to "identify the needs and wants of the 432,000 strong Sikh population in the UK." The BSR is "one of the few large-scale surveys undertaken of Britain's Sikhs" and it is one of the largest projects to study this group of people in the country.

BSR is launched annually in Parliament. The report has been quoted in the British Parliament, referred to in pieces of research and white papers relating to Sikhs or faith in general, and used by public bodies, the corporate sector and third sector groups. The report is also meant to help other non-Sikh organisations better work with Sikhs in the UK. The BSR fills a gap in information relating to modern Sikhs in Britain.

In 2019, the report was used to support the first Sikh National History and Awareness Month.

Content 
The report, which focuses on the views of Sikhs living in Britain, is organized into several sections, including an introduction, review of relevant literature, research methodology and then goes into the selected feedback areas. The report also addresses recommendations for areas in people's lives that need improvement. BSR has focused on different subjects over the last few years. In 2018, the focus of the report was mental health which has subsequently led to a new generation of Sikhs more open to discussions and leading the dialogue regarding mental health within the British Sikh Community.

In the first year, the respondents were selected through an online study, which the BSR acknowledged as being skewed towards those who have internet access.

Awards and nominations 
The British Sikh Report team has been awarded a wide range of awards recognising their community work, including:
 In the 2019 New Year Honours, Dr Jagbir Jhutti-Johal, the academic advisor to the British Sikh Report and senior lecturer in Sikh studies at the University of Birmingham received an OBE for services to higher education, faith communities and the voluntary sector.
 In the 2018 Birthday Honours, Jagdev Singh Virdee, the editor of the British Sikh Report, received an MBE for services to statistics and the Sikh community in the UK. He is the most senior expert in official statistics amongst Sikhs globally.
 In the 2018 New Year Honours, Onkardeep Singh, a founding trustee, received an MBE for services to faith communities and young people in the UK.  He became the youngest person of South Asian heritage to receive this award.
 In the 2017 New Year Honours the chairman, Jasvir Singh (barrister), received an OBE for services to faith communities and social cohesion in the UK.  He became the youngest Sikh to receive this award.

See also 
 List of British Sikhs
 Sikhism in the United Kingdom
 Sikhism in England

References

External links 
 British Sikh Report

British culture by ethnicity
Sikh culture
Sikh mass media
Sikh organisations
Sikh political parties
Sikh politics
Sikh organisations based in the United Kingdom
Religion in London
2010 establishments in the United Kingdom
Religious organizations established in 2010
Charities based in the United Kingdom
Charity in Europe
Charities based in Europe
Religious charities
Development charities based in the United Kingdom
International organisations based in London
Organisations based in London
Public policy think tanks based in the United Kingdom
Charities based in Birmingham, West Midlands
Charities based in the West Midlands (county)
Clubs and societies in London
Cultural organisations based in London
Diaspora organisations based in London
Educational organisations based in London
Non-profit organisations based in London
Religious organisations based in London
Youth organisations based in London
Educational foundations
Political and economic research foundations
Youth charities
Charities for young adults